Walt Whitman Park may refer to:

 Walt Whitman Park (Brooklyn)
 Walt Whitman Park (Washington, D.C.)